This article is a list of historic places in Côte-Nord, entered on the Canadian Register of Historic Places, whether they are federal, provincial, or municipal. All addresses are the administrative Region 09. For all other listings in the province of Quebec, see List of historic places in Quebec.

See also
List of historic places in Quebec

Cote
Côte-Nord